Heinrich Ritter von Kogerer (18 March 1819 – 20 November 1899) was an Austrian statesman who served as the Imperial and Royal Court Counselor and Director General of the Austro-Hungarian Empire.

He was married to Julia Patonaz. His daughter, Auguste von Kogerer, married Carl von In der Maur.

References 

1819 births
1899 deaths
Austrian knights
Government ministers of Austria-Hungary